The Indian School of Business (ISB) is a private business school established in India in 2001. It has two parallel campuses in India, in Hyderabad (Telangana) and Mohali (Punjab). It offers certificates in various post-graduate management programs. ISB became the 100th Triple Accredited business school in the world (AMBA, EQUIS, AACSB) upon achieving AMBA accreditation on 12 May 2020.

ISB is currently the highest ranked business school in India as ranked by the Forbes, Financial Times, Economist, Poets&Quants and Bloomberg Businesssweek Global MBA Rankings

History
The Indian School of Business (ISB) was started in 1996 by a group of businessmen and academics. Co-founders Rajat Gupta and Anil Kumar, senior executives of McKinsey & Company, directed teams of McKinsey consultants to start the school. Gupta recruited U.S. business leaders while Kumar recruited Indian leaders for its executive board. Formal partnerships were established with international business schools Wharton and Kellogg. Pramath Sinha, then a junior partner at McKinsey in India, was persuaded to take a leave of absence to be the school's first dean. Rajat Gupta became the school's first chairman and was succeeded by Adi Godrej in 2011. The then Chief Minister of Andhra Pradesh Sri N. Chandrababu Naidu played an important role for establishment of ISB in Hyderabad. The foundation stone for the campus was laid in 1999 and was inaugurated by Prime Minister Atal Bihari Vajpayee in 2001. The Government of Punjab sanctioned the Mohali Campus in 2010; its foundation stone was laid in September 2010 by Punjab Chief Minister Prakash Singh Badal, and was inaugurated in December 2012 by the then Union Minister of Finance, P. Chidambaram.

Campuses

The Indian School of Business has two parallel campuses in Hyderabad, Telangana and Mohali, Punjab.

Hyderabad campus
It is the older campus and was designed by Vikram Lall and established in 2001 and is spread across . It includes the academic centre, a recreation centre, and four student villages each accommodating 130 to 210 students.

The Hyderabad campus is certified by the Indian green building council.

Mohali campus
The modern Mohali campus began operations on 14 April 2012, and offers ISB's Post-Graduate Programme (PGP) and additional short-term executive education programs. The campus was designed by Perkins Eastman Architects led by Aaron Schwarz. The entire campus is Wi-Fi enabled. The academic block houses lecture theatres, faculty offices and lounge, the learning resource centre (LRC), and an atrium which can serve as a 500-seat auditorium. The campus also hosts four other research institutes:
Max Institute of Healthcare Management
Bharti Institute of Public Policy
Munjal Institute for Global Manufacturing
Punj Lloyd Institute of Infrastructure Management

Academics

Accreditation
ISB is accredited by AMBA, EQUIS and AACSB. ISB became the 100th Triple Accredited institution in the world upon achieving AMBA accreditation on 12 May 2020.

ISB is not accredited by the All India Council for Technical Education (AICTE) and has not applied for such accreditation, as it offers a certificate program and not a degree or a diploma. The US Citizenship and Immigration Services (USCIS) has ruled that for the purposes of US Visa and Green Cards, the post-graduate PGP certificate awarded by ISB is not equivalent to a Master of Business Administration degree, unlike similarly named certificates awarded by the Indian Institutes of Management.

Programmes

ISB is the academic partner for the Goldman Sachs 10,000 Women Entrepreneurs Certificate programme in India which provides management education to "under-served women".

Young Leaders' Programme
The Young Leaders' Programme (YLP) select undergraduate students for mentoring over a period of two years while they work. These individuals are also awarded a scholarship of 100,000 (approx. US$2000) during the course of the programme. Mentored students can join ISB following successful completion of the work-mentorship programme. 45 undergraduate students were selected for when the programme began in 2011.

YLP at Hyderabad includes integrated budgetary system (IBS), integrated financing system (IFS), management information service (MIS) marketing, and management control system (MCS).

Management Programme in Public Policy
The Management Programme in Public Policy (MPPP) began in 2015 and was developed by the Bharti Institute of Public Policy in consultation with The Fletcher School of Law and Diplomacy. The programme is oriented towards mid-career professionals, examining public policy perspectives on a wide range of economic and management subjects. The first class of students were drawn from government, public sector and civil society organisations.

ISB Policy Conclave 
Every year ISB Organizing Policy Conclave Program, This Policy Conclaveis a policy summit that brings together luminaries from the public sector, private sector and the civil society along with the brightest minds at ISB to discuss policy issues. The idea is to focus on shaping the dialogue, setting the narrative and focusing agenda on issues that really matter for the India beyond 2020.

ISBInsight
ISBInsight (stylized ISBInsight) is the biannual research periodical of ISB, featuring articles based on management research from Indian and emerging markets. It presents research across management areas such as strategy, marketing, information technology, accounting, behavioural studies, finance, economics and public policy. It also publishes interviews with leaders and decision makers from industry, academia, government and non-governmental organisations.

Rankings

Worldwide, the Financial Times has ranked ISB  32 (No.1 from India) in its Global MBA Ranking 2022 .
ISB is ranked 7th globally (No.1 from India) in the Forbes Best Business Schools 2019 rankings
ISB is ranked 44th Globally (No.1 from India) in the Economist Global MBA rankings 
Poets and Quants ranks ISB as the 17th best business school (No.1 from India) outside the US It is ranked 5th in the Asia Pacific region (No.1 in India) by Bloomberg Businessweek's global rankings for best business schools.

Notable alumni

Business
Bijai Jayarajan, Founder, Loylty Rewardz 
Aman Gupta, CEO & Co-founder, Boat.
Nipun Malhotra, Founder,  Nipman Foundation 
Ankur Warikoo, Co-Founder of nearbuy.com and internet personality.
Ratan M Kolera, banking professional

Arts, Entertainment, and Writing
Shilpa Singh, Miss Universe India 2012
Runki Goswami, Indian Classical singer and composer
Namrata Brar, Indian-American journalist
Shvetha Jaishankar (MBA 04), Co-founder Globosport, Miss India International 1998, and Author  
Ravinder Singh, Author

Sports
Anshul Kothari, Indian swimming team 

Viren Rasquinha (MBA 09) - Former Indian Hockey Captain

See also

 List of business schools in Hyderabad, India

References

External links
 
{{ISB Executive Education}}

Indian School of Business
2001 establishments in Andhra Pradesh
Research institutes in Punjab, India
Education in Mohali
Educational institutions established in 2001
2012 establishments in Punjab, India